Waldenbuch (Swabian: Waldebuech) is a town in the district of Böblingen, Baden-Württemberg, Germany.

It is the home of the popular Ritter Sport brand of chocolate.

Geography

Geographical location

Waldenbuch is situated at an altitude reaching from 340 to 460 meters on the northern edge of Schönbuch forest, 16 km south of Stuttgart.

Districts
Waldenbuch consists of the following districts Sonnenhang, Kalkofen, Weilerberg, Glashütte, Stadtkern ("Städtle"), Liebenau and Hasenhof.

History
Waldenbuch was first mentioned in documents in 1296. The city rights were confirmed September 14, 1363. Since 1363 the city has belonged to Württemberg, but was under the repurchase option of Austria.

Religions
Since the Reformation Waldenbuch has been Evangelical. It was only in 1950 that WW2 German expellees founded another  Roman Catholic church, St. Martinus.

Population
Population figures are taken from census results (¹) or statistical data from the data office in Stuttgart.

Economy and Infrastructure

Transportation
Country road 1208 (old B 27) connects the city to the north with Stuttgart and to the south with Tübingen. The L 1185 leads west to Böblingen and east to Nürtingen.
In 1928 the Siebenmühlental-Railway opened to Leinfelden and was later decommissioned in 1956. The local public transport system is operated today by bus line 86 (Vaihingen-Leinfelden-Waldenbuch) of the Stuttgarter Straßenbahnen. Bus lines 760 (Böblingen-Schönaich-Waldenbuch), 826 (Leinfelden-Waldenbuch-Tübingen) and 828 (Stuttgart Airport Waldenbuch-Tübingen) are operated by Regional Bus Stuttgart.

Sights and culture
In the centre of Waldenbuch is the town's landmark Schloss Waldenbuch. The castle is the domicile of the Museum der Alltagskultur, one of the most important museums of folk culture in Germany.

Buildings
 The Stadtkirche St. Veit, dates back in its origins to the 14th century.
 The old rectory is in the immediate vicinity of the town church. The current building dates from 1720; Since 1990 it serves as a municipal music school.

 The Schloss Waldenbuch was a hunting lodge of the Dukes of Württemberg. The core of the system goes back to a castle which was first mentioned in 1381.

 Castle and Stadtkirche including associated buildings make up the market square where the town hall is also situated. 
 Opposite the town hall is the headquarters counterclaim, also a half-timbered building. It was built around 1750 as a guesthouse for court hunting parties. 
 The market fountain, which is approximately in the middle of the square, dates back to 1953.
 The Dannecker House'', built around 1620. Here the sculptor Johann Heinrich Dannecker spent his childhood with his grandparents.

References

External links

 The official website of Waldenbuch (German)
 Stuttgart tourist site on Waldenbuch (English)
 Museum der Alltagskultur (Museum of Everyday Life)

Böblingen (district)